WPRR (1680 AM) is an urban adult contemporary radio station serving the Grand Rapids, Michigan area. The station is currently owned by Goodrich Radio.

History

WPRR originated as the expanded band "twin" of an existing station on the standard AM band.

On March 17, 1997 the Federal Communications Commission (FCC) announced that eighty-eight stations had been given permission to move to newly available "Expanded Band" transmitting frequencies, ranging from 1610 to 1700 kHz, with WMHG in Muskegon, Michigan authorized to move from 1600 kHz to 1680 kHz.

A construction permit for the expanded band station was assigned the call letters WBHD on September 4, 1998. The FCC's initial policy was that both the original station and its expanded band counterpart could operate simultaneously for up to five years, after which owners would have to turn in one of the two licenses, depending on whether they preferred the new assignment or elected to remain on the original frequency. However, this deadline was extended multiple times, and both stations remained authorized after the initial five year period. (WMHG was deleted on March 3, 2008, after it was determined that its license had been improperly transferred to a new owner).

On October 15, 1998, this station changed its call sign to WJNZ, flipping to an Urban Contemporary format as "1680 Jamz," giving Grand Rapids its first 24-hour Urban station at the time. By 2003, the station moved to 1140 AM, but that station eventually changed its format to Catholic-centered talk and preaching.

On June 16, 2003, the call letters were changed to WDSS, with a switch to Radio Disney programming. The station was poorly maintained during the Radio Disney years as station IDs were often mixed up and no ID was heard at the top of the hour.

On August 5, 2008, WDSS discontinued the Radio Disney format, switching to a continuous-loop announcement, announcing the changeover to a new "Public Reality Radio" format in September. The announcement also mentioned that the station's call sign would change over to WPRR on August 18 (the new calls actually took effect two days later). According to station owner Bob Goodrich, Public Reality Radio was a non-profit, educational endeavor, featuring "a variety of podcasts and programming". On September 22, 2008, "Public Reality Radio" was launched, which includes programming from the Pacifica Radio network.

On July 23, 2020, WPRR dropped the "Public Reality Radio" format (which continued on WPRR-FM 90.1 FM in Allegan County's Clyde Township) and changed their format to urban adult contemporary, branded as "102.5 The Ride".

Translators
In 2010, WPRR established a repeater, W237CZ at 95.3 MHz. Goodrich would acquire the repeater from the Horizon Christian Fellowship in February 2010.

On November 19, 2012, WPRR purchased WXPZ from Larlen Communications. On July 5, 2014, WXPZ's call sign was changed to WPRR-FM.

In 2016, WPRR purchased W273DD at 102.5 MHz and moved it to Alpine Township. This repeater went on air in early 2017.

Programming
Programs previously aired on the station included Democracy Now!, The Thom Hartmann Program, The David Pakman Show, The Union Edge, Loud and Clear with Brian Becker, The Bradcast with Brad Friedman and other local shows.

Previous logo

References

External links
Michiguide.com - WDSS History

PRR (AM)
Radio stations established in 1998
Urban adult contemporary radio stations in the United States